Chromaticity is an objective specification of the quality of a color regardless of its luminance. Chromaticity consists of two independent parameters, often specified as hue (h) and colorfulness (s), where the latter is alternatively called saturation, chroma, intensity, or excitation purity. This number of parameters follows from trichromacy of vision of most humans, which is assumed by most models in color science.

Quantitative description
In color science, the white point of an illuminant or of a display is a neutral reference characterized by a chromaticity; all other chromaticities may be defined in relation to this reference using polar coordinates. The hue is the angular component, and the purity is the radial component, normalized by the maximum radius for that hue.

Purity is roughly equivalent to the term "saturation" in the HSV color model. The property "hue" is as used in general color theory and in specific color models such as HSV and HSL color spaces, though it is more perceptually uniform in color models such as Munsell, CIELAB or CIECAM02.

Some color spaces separate the three dimensions of color into one luminance dimension and a pair of chromaticity dimensions.

These pairs determine a chromaticity as affine coordinates on a triangle in a 2D-space, which contains all possible chromaticities. Other coordinate systems on the same X-Y-Z triangle, or other color triangles, can be used.

The xyY space is a cross between the CIE XYZ and its normalized chromaticity coordinates xyz, such that the luminance Y is preserved and augmented with just the required two chromaticity dimensions.

See also

 CIE xyY (chromaticity diagram)
 Chrominance
 rg chromaticity
 Impossible color
 Color index in astronomy

References

External links 
 Stanford University CS 178 interactive Flash demo  explaining chromaticity diagrams.
 JOES application software for calculation and plotting of CIE 1931 and 1976 from spectra

Color
Photometry